Bellaire is an unincorporated community in Smith County, Kansas, United States.  It was named after Bellaire, Ohio.

History
A post office was opened in Bellaire in 1888, and remained in operation until it was discontinued in 1980.

According to a 1912 encyclopedia of Kansas, Bellaire was once a thriving town with a bank, post office, two churches and a reported population of 200.

Geography
Its elevation is 1,873 feet and its location is Latitude 39.7983453, Longitude -98.6761812.

References

Further reading

External links
 Smith County maps: Current, Historic, KDOT

Unincorporated communities in Kansas
Unincorporated communities in Smith County, Kansas